Harold "Hal" Cooper (February 23, 1923 – April 11, 2014) was an American television director and executive producer who worked primarily on sitcoms. After establishing himself as a pioneer of the Golden Age of Television, Cooper became a regular director on many of the popular and enduring shows of the 1960s, 1970s and 1980s. 

Cooper directed 54 episodes of I Dream of Jeannie between 1966 and 1969 and 126 of the 141 episodes of Maude, where he also served as executive producer from 1975 through 1978. His work on the latter series earned him two Emmy Award nominations as well as three nominations from the Directors Guild of America Awards.

Early life
Born in The Bronx, New York, on February 23, 1923, Cooper began his entertainment career at the age of 9, becoming part of the acting troupe on the children's radio show Rainbow House. When he wasn't on microphone, Cooper spent his time in the control room, learning about directing from the show's producer and director, Bob Emery. One day in 1936, Emery fell ill two hours before the show was to go live and he chose Cooper to fill in for him, resulting in Cooper directing his first live broadcast at the age of 13.

In 1940, Cooper began attending the University of Michigan, where he met his first wife, Pat Meikle, whom he married in 1944. His education was interrupted by World War II in 1943, when he was commissioned as a lieutenant (junior grade) into the U.S. Naval Reserve and served in the Pacific Theater of Operations. He returned to the university in 1946 and graduated with a B.A. that same year, after which he set out on a career in live television.

Career
Cooper wrote, produced and acted in the pioneering live daytime children's series Your Television Babysitter for the DuMont Network. This show, which was co-written and hosted by Cooper's wife, Pat Meikle, aired on DuMont's first full day television broadcasting and led to a spin-off, The Magic Cottage, which Cooper also produced.

From 1950 to 1957, Cooper directed and produced a number of daytime soap operas, including Search for Tomorrow. He moved to Los Angeles, California in 1958, where he produced and directed the soap opera For Better or Worse during 1959-1960. He broke into network television sitcoms in 1962, starting with two episodes of The Dick Van Dyke Show. Over the next three decades, he amassed an extensive number of directing credits, which, in addition to I Dream of Jeannie and Maude, included 38 episodes of Mayberry R.F.D., 23 episodes of That Girl, 27 episodes of The Courtship of Eddie's Father, 11 episodes of The Odd Couple, 8 episodes of The Brady Bunch, 81 episodes of Gimme a Break!, 19 episodes of Empty Nest and 67 episodes of Dear John. He was also an executive producer on the latter three series.

TV movies and pilots
 Bobby Jo and the Good Time Band (1972 CBS pilot)
 Jerry (1974 CBS pilot)
 The Rear Guard (1976 ABC pilot)
 Freeman (1976 ABC pilot)
 McNamara's Band (1977 ABC pilot)
 King of the Road (1978 pilot)
 Snavely (1978 ABC pilot)
 Did You Hear About Josh and Kelly? (1980 pilot)
 Mr. and Mrs. and Mr. (1980 TV movie)
 And They Lived Happily Ever After (1981 CBS pilot)
 Million Dollar Infield (1982 TV movie)
 The Astronauts (1982 CBS pilot)
 A Fine Romance (1983 CBS pilot)
 Never Again (1984 NBC pilot)
 The Stiller and Meara Show (1986 pilot)
 Starting Now (1989 CBS pilot)

Later years and death
Cooper retired in 1996; his final screen credit as director was a January 1997 episode of Something So Right. He died of heart failure at his home in Beverly Hills on April 11, 2014. He was 91.

References

External links

1923 births
2014 deaths
American television directors
University of Michigan alumni